Ken Wellman (2 June 1930 – 21 March 2013) was an Australian ice hockey player. He competed in the men's tournament at the 1960 Winter Olympics.

References

1930 births
2013 deaths
Australian ice hockey players
Olympic ice hockey players of Australia
Ice hockey players at the 1960 Winter Olympics
Sportspeople from Melbourne